Pablo Yoiris (born 1972) is an Argentine writer. He has published three books: 
 Resnik, winner of the Concurso de Novela de Crímenes Medellín Negro 2015 
 Usted está aquí, winner of the Premio Córdoba Mata 2015 
 Los Buscamuertes, finalist for the Premio BAN! 2014

He also won the Premio Planeta Digital for his story "Lamm".

References

21st-century Argentine male writers
1972 births
Living people
Date of birth missing (living people)
Place of birth missing (living people)